Lu Jianren is a Chinese football coach and a former international goalkeeper who played for Beijing FC and China in the 1984 Asian Cup.

Playing career 
Lu Jianren played for his local football club Beijing FC's youth team before gaining promotion to the senior team in the 1979 league season. At Beijing he was part of the team that won the 1982 league title, which led to him receiving a call-up to the Chinese national team. He then played understudy to Yang Ning as China's second choice goalkeeper in the 1984 AFC Asian Cup, however as the tournament progressed the manager Zeng Xuelin, who Lu previously worked with at Beijing, decided to promote him to the team's first choice goalkeeper half way through the campaign. The move worked and China reached the final, however China lost to Saudi Arabia 2-0 and finished runners-up. Despite the defeat Lu was China's first choice goalkeeper until 19 May 1985 when during the 19 May incident saw China play a vital FIFA World Cup qualifier against Hong Kong at home and while China were overwhelming favourites they lost 2–1, which was met with intense rioting by the Chinese fans and effectively ended Lu's international career soon afterwards.

Career statistics

International statistics

Honours

Player
Beijing FC
Chinese Jia-A League: 1982

References

External links
Team China Stats
Player profile at Sodasoccer

1959 births
Living people
Chinese footballers
Footballers from Beijing
China international footballers
1984 AFC Asian Cup players
Chinese football managers
Beijing Guoan F.C. players
Association football goalkeepers
Shenzhen F.C. managers